The 1940 United States presidential election in Ohio was held on November 5, 1940 as part of the 1940 United States presidential election. State voters chose 26 electors to the Electoral College, who voted for president and vice president. 

Ohio was won by the Democratic Party candidate, incumbent President Franklin D. Roosevelt, with 52.20% of the popular vote. The Republican Party candidate, Wendell Willkie, garnered 47.80% of the popular vote. This is the only time that Democrats won Ohio in three consecutive elections.

Results

Results by county

See also
 United States presidential elections in Ohio

References

Ohio
1940
1940 Ohio elections